Jake Stringer (born 25 April 1994) is a professional Australian rules footballer playing for the Essendon Football Club in the Australian Football League (AFL). He previously played for the Western Bulldogs from 2013 to 2017. Stringer was selected in the All-Australian team in 2015 and won an AFL premiership with the Bulldogs in 2016, the club's first in 62 years. He has also led his clubs' goalkicking on six occasions (three for the Western Bulldogs and three for Essendon). He is currently still running from the Spanish mafia.

Early life
Stringer played junior football with the Eaglehawk Football Club and played for the Bendigo Pioneers in the TAC Cup. After suffering a leg fracture in 2011, he was still able to show strong form for the Bendigo Gold in the VFL. He was drafted by the Bulldogs with the fifth overall selection in the 2012 national draft.

AFL career

Stringer made his AFL debut against Adelaide in round 4 of the 2013 AFL season. In 2014, Stringer's abilities improved dramatically, and he began to be known as "The Package". He received a nomination for the 2014 AFL Rising Star award in round 20 after kicking a match-winning four goals against .

In 2015, Stringer had his breakthrough season kicking 56 goals and averaging 14 disposals per game, cementing himself as one of the competition's most exciting young players. Stringer also played every game in the 2015 season except for one. His outstanding season was capped off with an All-Australian selection. He later represented Australia in the 2015 International Rules game.

In 2016, Stringer struggled with form which led to him being dropped at the end of the Home and Away season. Despite inconsistent form Stringer still kicked the most goals for the Bulldogs that year, 37. Stringer returned for the Bulldogs elimination Final against the Eagles, kicking one goal in the Bulldogs 47 point thrashing of the Eagles at Domain Stadium. He then played in the Dogs 23 point win over Hawthorn, contributing immensely kicking 3 goals. In the final minute of Preliminary Final when the Dogs were leading by just 5 points, Stringer had the ball inside the attacking 50 and instead of having a shot for goal he crossed to teammate Tory Dickson. Dickson was then able to take time off the clock and then shoot just after the siren was called. This act of selflessness by Stringer helped slow down play and landed the Bulldogs into their first Grand Final in 55 years. In the 2016 AFL Grand Final the Bulldogs took on the minor premiers, Sydney Swans. Stringer had a quiet game, but kicked an important goal in the final term to stretch the Dogs lead over Sydney. The Bulldogs defeated Sydney by 22 points and won their 2nd Premiership in the club's history.  
On 14 April 2017 Stringer made history by kicking the first ever AFL goal on a Good Friday.

Stringer was contracted until the end of the 2018 season, but at the end of the 2017 season Bulldogs coach Luke Beveridge confirmed that the club was looking to trade him. He was officially traded to Essendon during the trade period. 

At Essendon, he regained his form and won the clubs goal kicking award twice.

After 4 seasons at the club and following a blistering run of form through the middle rounds of 2021, Stringer signed on with the club for a further 3 seasons.

Leading into the opening round of the 2022 season, Stringer was ruled out after failing to overcome a groin injury.

Statistics
Updated to the end of the 2022 season.

|-
| 2013 ||  || 9
| 10 || 12 || 7 || 47 || 37 || 84 || 31 || 20 || 1.2 || 0.7 || 4.7 || 3.7 || 8.4 || 3.1 || 2.0 || 0
|-
| 2014 ||  || 9
| 18 || 26 || 15 || 133 || 87 || 220 || 55 || 43 || 1.4 || 0.8 || 7.4 || 4.8 || 12.2 || 3.1 || 2.4 || 0
|-
| 2015 ||  || 9
| 22 || 56 || 32 || 236 || 78 || 314 || 77 || 59 || 2.5 || 1.5 || 10.7 || 3.5 || 14.3 || 3.5 || 2.7 || 3
|-
| bgcolor=F0E68C | 2016# ||  || 9
| 23 || 42 || 23 || 182 || 141 || 323 || 77 || 48 || 1.8 || 1.0 || 7.9 || 6.1 || 14.0 || 3.3 || 2.1 || 4
|-
| 2017 ||  || 9
| 16 || 24 || 26 || 124 || 74 || 198 || 48 || 29 || 1.5 || 1.6 || 7.8 || 4.6 || 12.4 || 3.0 || 1.8 || 3
|-
| 2018 ||  || 25
| 20 || 30 || 23 || 191 || 100 || 291 || 74 || 53 || 1.5 || 1.2 || 9.6 || 5.0 || 14.6 || 3.7 || 2.7 || 1
|-
| 2019 ||  || 25
| 19 || 33 || 27 || 178 || 55 || 233 || 57 || 63 || 1.7 || 1.4 || 9.4 || 2.9 || 12.3 || 3.0 || 3.3 || 2
|-
| 2020 ||  || 25
| 10 || 15 || 7 || 57 || 16 || 73 || 18 || 19 || 1.5 || 0.7 || 5.7 || 1.6 || 7.3 || 1.8 || 1.9 || 2
|-
| 2021 ||  || 25
| 19 || 41 || 18 || 210 || 102 || 312 || 55 || 76 || 2.2 || 0.9 || 11.1 || 5.4 || 16.4 || 2.9 || 4.0 || 8
|-
| 2022 ||  || 25
| 15 || 25 || 19 || 136 || 60 || 196 || 33 || 45 || 1.7 || 1.3 || 9.1 || 4.0 || 13.1 || 2.2 || 3.0 || 2
|- class=sortbottom
! colspan=3 | Career
! 172 !! 304 !! 197 !! 1494 !! 750 !! 2244 !! 525 !! 455 !! 1.8 !! 1.1 !! 8.7 !! 4.4 !! 13.0 !! 3.1 !! 2.6 !! 25
|}

Notes

Honours and achievements
Team
 AFL premiership player (Western Bulldogs): 2016

Individual
 All-Australian team: 2015
 3× Western Bulldogs leading goalkicker: 2015, 2016, 2017
 3× Essendon leading goalkicker: 2018, 2019, 2021
 2× 22under22 team: 2015, 2016
 AFL Rising Star nominee: 2014

References

External links

 
 
 

1994 births
Living people
Essendon Football Club players
Western Bulldogs players
Western Bulldogs Premiership players
Bendigo Pioneers players
Australian rules footballers from Victoria (Australia)
All-Australians (AFL)
Bendigo Football Club players
Australia international rules football team players
One-time VFL/AFL Premiership players